Bijerk (also Romanized as Bījerḵ) is a village in Chenaran Rural District, in the Central District of Chenaran County, Razavi Khorasan Province, Iran. At the 2006 census, its population was 43, in 11 families.

References 

Populated places in Chenaran County